The UBV Photoelectric Photometry Catalogue, or UBV M, is the star brightness catalogue that complies to the UBV photometric system developed by astronomer Harold Johnson.

Evolution of the  UBV Photoelectric Photometry Catalogue
The early edition of 1968 by Blanco, sometimes referred as simply the "Photoelectric Catalogue" or UBV was replaced by the Mermilliod edition UBV M in 1987 and extended in 1993.
As the atmospheric extinction problem associated with the UBV photometric system became evident, the UBV Photoelectric Photometry Catalogue was phased-out in 2000.

Download locations 
The UBV catalog data format is in plain text. After uncompressing by unzip or gunzip it can be seen by any text viewers or by the online ADC viewer. Specifications for the catalog format are provided at the download sites.

 Original catalogue data, 1953-1985, 109293 objects (alternative reference is Mermilliod, 1987)
 Catalogue extension, 1986-1992, 25639 objects
 Alternative download site for catalogue extension, 1986-1992, 25639 objects

Astronomical catalogues of stars